Dion Jermaine Kelly-Evans (born 21 September 1996) is a professional footballer who plays as a defender for Boreham Wood.

Career
On 21 May 2015, Kelly-Evans signed his first professional contract with Coventry City on a one-year deal which would begin 1 July 2015.

He made his professional début on 8 May 2016, the last game of the 2015–16 season, against Oldham Athletic coming on for Andy Rose at Half-time. He came on as a substitute as Coventry won the 2017 EFL Trophy Final.

He was released by Coventry at the end of the 2017–18 season after helping them gain promotion back to EFL League One.

In August 2018 he signed for Kettering Town winning the Evo-Stik League South Premier Central. Also named Chiefs Executive Player Of The Season. 

On 1 August 2019, Kelly-Evans signed for Notts County helping them qualify for the play-offs in each of his three seasons on County’s quest back to the  EFL League Two.  Kelly-Evans was released at the end of the 2021–22 season.

On 1 July 2022, Kelly-Evans joined Boreham Wood.

Career statistics

Personal life
Kelly-Evans is the twin brother of fellow former Coventry City player Devon Kelly-Evans.

References

External links
Dion Kelly-Evans player profile at ccfc.co.uk

1996 births
Living people
Footballers from Coventry
English footballers
Association football defenders
Association football midfielders
Coventry City F.C. players
Kettering Town F.C. players
Notts County F.C. players
Boreham Wood F.C. players
English Football League players
National League (English football) players